The 1998 NCAA Division I Men's Basketball Championship Game was the finals of the 1998 NCAA Division I men's basketball tournament and it determined the national champion for the 1997–98 NCAA Division I men's basketball season  The 1998 National Title Game was played on March 30, 1998, at the Alamodome in San Antonio, Texas, The 1998 National Title Game was played between the 1998 South Regional Champions, No. 2-seeded Kentucky and the 1998 West Regional Champions, No. 3-seeded Utah.

Participants

Utah

West Regional
Utah (3) 85, San Francisco (14) 68
Utah 75, Arkansas (6) 69
Utah 65, West Virginia (10) 62
Utah 76, Arizona (1) 51
Final Four
Utah 65, North Carolina (1) 59

Kentucky

Seeding in brackets
East
Kentucky (2) 82, South Carolina State (15) 67
Kentucky 88, Saint Louis (10) 61
Kentucky 94, UCLA (6) 66
Kentucky 86, Duke (1) 84
Final Four
 Kentucky 86, Stanford (3) 85 (OT)

Starting lineups

Game summary

References

NCAA Division I Men's Basketball Championship Game
NCAA Division I Men's Basketball Championship Games
Utah Utes men's basketball
College sports tournaments in Texas
Basketball competitions in San Antonio
NCAA Division I Men's Basketball Championship Game
NCAA Division I Men's Basketball Championship Game
20th century in San Antonio